Hamnavoe may refer to:

The town of Stromness in Orkney, formerly known as Hamnavoe
Several towns, villages or hamlets in the Shetland Islands:
Hamnavoe, West Burra, in West Burra
Hamnavoe, Eshaness, in Eshaness
Hamnavoe, Papa Stour, in Papa Stour
Hamnavoe, Lunna Ness, in Lunna Ness
Hamnavoe, Yell, in Yell
The ferry MV Hamnavoe
Hamnavoe (poem), a poem by George Mackay Brown